Chris Burton may refer to:

 Chris Burton (Australian footballer) (born 1961), Australian rules footballer
 Chris Burton (equestrian) (born 1981), Australian equestrian
 Chris Burton (rugby league) (born 1956), British rugby league footballer
 Chris Burton (singer), Danish singer, songwriter